DSRC is dedicated short-range communications, a short to medium range wireless protocol.

DSRC may also refer to:

 Dakota Southern Railway (reporting mark), a US railroad